Lo Mang is a Hong Kong martial artist and actor who was born as Lo Kwan Lam in Hong Kong on 23 July 1952. Primarily known for starring in Shaw Brothers kung fu movies during the latter part of the 1970s and into the 1980s. He is a member of the famous ensemble known as the Venom Mob who were renowned for their martial arts and acting skills.

His most famous roles are the Toad, #5 in Chang Cheh's The Five Deadly Venoms  and Golden Arm Kid in Kid with the Golden Arm. He is a skilled martial artist and practiced Taijiquan for years, as well as Chu Gar Tong Long Southern Praying Mantis for over 13 years before starting an acting career. He had a well built physique despite doing no weight training. Sometimes referred to as the "Shaolin Hercules," he is renowned for playing the strongest personality in his films, but being the first one to be killed.

He is still active in the Hong Kong TV industry. Nowadays he has revamped his acting style as a comedy actor and is involved in directing action choreography for some productions.

Filmography
Shaolin Temple (1976) a.k.a. U.S. title: Death Chamber - Shaolin monk
The Naval Commandos (1977)
The Last Strike (1977) a.k.a. U.S. title: Soul Brothers of Kung Fu
Chinatown Kid (1977) - Green Drangons gang leader
The Brave Archer (1977) a.k.a. U.S. title: Kung Fu Warlords - Han Pao Chu of the Seven Weirdos of Chiang-Nan
The Brave Archer 2 (1978) a.k.a. U.S. title: Kung Fu Warlords Part II - Iron Palm Chief
Five Deadly Venoms (1978) - Li Hao the Toad (#5)
Invincible Shaolin (1978) a.k.a. U.S. title: Unbeatable Dragon - Ho Ming Pao
Kid with the Golden Arm (1979) - Golden Arm, Chief #1 of the Chih Sah Gang
Crippled Avengers (1979) a.k.a. U.S. title: Mortal Combat; a.k.a. Dragon Dynasty region 1 DVD title: Return of the 5 Deadly Venoms - the deaf & mute blacksmith Wei
Shaolin Rescuers (1979) a.k.a. U.S. title: Avenging Warriors of Shaolin - Chin Ah Chen
Magnificent Ruffians (1979) a.k.a. U.S. title: The Destroyers - Kuan Yun
The Daredevils (1979) a.k.a. U.S. title: Daredevils of Kung Fu - Yang Ta-Ying
Life Gamble (1979) (shot in 1977) - Mo Chun-Feng
Heaven and Hell (1980) a.k.a. U.S. title: Shaolin Hellgate (shot in 1976) - Wei Han Ting 
The Rebel Intruders (1980) a.k.a. U.S. title: Killer Army - Chi Chun-Peng
2 Champions of Shaolin (1980) - Tong Chien-Chin "the Shaolin Hercules"
Ten Tigers of Kwangtung (1979) - Iron Fingers Chen Tie Fou
The Brave Archer 3 (1981) a.k.a. U.S. title: Blast of the Iron Palm - Iron Palm Chief
Lion Vs. Lion (1981) a.k.a. U.S. title: Roar of the Lion - Ah Yu
Battle for the Republic of China (1981)
Clan Feuds (1982) aka: The Great Banner - Yun Cheng
Five Element Ninjas (1982) a.k.a. U.S. title: Super Ninjas - Liang Chi-Sheng
Human Lanterns (1982) - Kuei Sze-Yin
Hex After Hex (1982) - Tsang Ma Su
82 Tenants (1982) - Johnny Lo
Bastard Swordsman (1983)
Fast Fingers (1983) - Captain Tieh Li Wei
Men from the Gutter (1983) - Sgt. Chao
Secret Service of the Imperial Court (1984) - Chao Pu Kuan
Crazy Shaolin Disciples (1985) a.k.a. U.S. VHS title: Enter The 36th Chamber - Hung Hsi-Kuan
Pursuit of a Killer (1985) - Ye Hong
This Man Is Dangerous (1985) - Chief Inspector Luo
Naughty Boys (1986)
Hard Boiled (1992)
Sex and Zen III (1998)
 The Tricky King (1998) - King of Tricks
Fire of Conscience (2010) - Tram witness
Ip Man 2 (2010)
Gallants (2010) - Qilin
Beach Spike (2011)
The Grandmaster (2013)
Ip Man 3 (2015)
Buddy Cops (2016)
Vampire Cleanup Department (2017)
Made in Chinatown (2019)
Ip Man 4 (2019)

Television series
 Mystery of the Twin Swords II (1992)
 The Buddhism Palm Strikes Back (1993)
 The Condor Heroes Return (1993)
 The Romance of the White Hair Maiden (1995)
 A Recipe for the Heart (1997)
 Journey to the West II (1998)
 Witness to a Prosecution (1999)
 The Heaven Sword and Dragon Saber (2000)
 Colourful Life (2001)
 Word Twisters' Adventures (2007)
 The Seventh Day (2008)
 A Journey Called Life (2008)
 D.I.E. (2008)
 Catch Me Now (2008)
 You're Hired (2009) - Employee of debt collector's company
 The Season of Fate (2010) - Shing-tin's bodyguard
 My Better Half (2010)
 In the Eye of the Beholder (2010) - Cameo ep. 10
 Fly with Me (2010)
 The Mysteries of Love (2010) - Guest star ep. 11
 Grace Under Fire (2011) - Guest star ep. 1, 21–22
 L'Escargot (2012)
 Til Love Do Us Lie (2012)
 Three Kingdoms RPG (2012)
 Divas in Distress (2012)
 Silver Spoon, Sterling Shackles (2012)
 Inbound Troubles (2013) ep. 4 and 16
 Come Home Love (2013)
 A Change of Heart (2013)
 Always and Ever (2013)
 Queen Divas (2014)
 Line Walker (2014) ep. 17, 18, 25 and 26 
 Raising the Bar (2015) - Sit Kim  
 Blue Veins (2016) - Chan Tai-ping

Music Video
 MC $oHo & KidNey - 'Black Mirror' (2021)

References

External links
 Lo Mang visits US/ 2007
 
 
 Lo Meng at the Hong Kong Cinemagic

1952 births
Hong Kong martial artists
TVB veteran actors
Living people
Hong Kong people of Hakka descent
Indigenous inhabitants of the New Territories in Hong Kong
People from Huiyang